Kegeti is a village in the Chüy Region of Kyrgyzstan. It is part of the Chüy District. Its population was 3,004 in 2021.

References

Populated places in Chüy Region